Access time is the time delay or latency between a request to an electronic system, and the access being completed or the requested data returned

 In a computer, it is the time interval between the instant at which an instruction control unit initiates a call for data or a request to store data, and the instant at which delivery of the data is completed or the storage is started.

See also
 Memory latency
 Mechanical latency
 Rotational latency
 Seek time

References

Network access